"The Face of Dorian Gray" is the debut single written and recorded by English singer Robert Marlow, released as both a 7-inch and 12-inch single in 1983 by Reset Records. Produced by Vince Clarke and Eric Radcliffe, it was recorded at Blackwing Studios in London. The single peaked at No. 93 on the UK Singles Chart, Marlow's only single to chart.

The album that it was intended to be on, The Peter Pan Effect, was later released in 1999 by Swedish label Energy Rekords.

Track listing
7-inch and 12-inch single
"The Face of Dorian Gray"
"The Tale of Dorian Gray"

Personnel
Credits are adapted from the single's back cover.
Pat Pagebacking vocals
Neville Brodysleeve design
Vince Clarkeproducer
Eric Radcliffeproducer

Charts

References

External links

1983 songs
1983 debut singles
British new wave songs
Song recordings produced by Eric Radcliffe